Icebreakers is an ice hockey team founded in 2002 by (among others) Peter Forsberg and Markus Näslund. Their purpose is to raise money for a foundation who give scholarships to handicapped or otherwise needy children. They raise this money not only by playing charity ice hockey games, but also by attending auctions or playing celebrity golf.

The team consists of Swedish players in the National Hockey League. The larger part are players who were at one time or another members of the Modo squad.

External links 
  Official homepage

Children's charities based in Sweden
Ice hockey teams in Sweden